Kuzhanthai Velappar Temple is a Hindu temple in the village of Poombarai near Kodaikanal in Dindigul.

10/12 centuries When Bogar returned from China after completed Palani andavar statue he built one more Navabasanam Statue at mid of Palani and PoombariWestern gates nowadays the place is called as Yanai Gejam(Bogar Forest). As per inscriptions in the temple which temple has built by king of Chera dynasty

Legend

POOMBARAI KUZHANTHAI VELAPPAR TEMPLE.
Kulanthai Velappar temple is situated in the village of Poombarai near Kodaikanal in Dindigul. There is a song- poem( Poombarai Velan) by sage Arunagiri Nathar. It was this Murugan who saved Arunagiri Nathar from a demon by taking the form of a child. Hence the main deity of this temple is called Kuzhanthai Velappar. The temple was built by a Chera King as per inscription. After completing Palani Andavar statue, Bogar built one more navabasanam (amalgam of nine poisons) idol at this place between Palani and Poombarai. This place is also called as Yanai Gejam (Bogar kadu). 

There are also some people who believes this idol is made up of dasaphasanam (amalgam of ten poisons). A shrine to Sithar Bogar is present in the south western corridor of this temple.

History
The idol of the Muruga in Poombarai, was created and consecrated by sage Bogar, one of aaseevaham's (Ancient Tamil Culture) eighteen great siddhas out of an amalgam of nine poisons or navapashanam. The legend also holds that, the sculptor had to work very rapidly to complete its features, but that he spent so much time in creating the face, he did not have time to bestow but a rough grace upon the rest of the body, thus explaining the contrast between the artistic perfection of the face and the slightly less accomplished work upon the body. A shrine to Bhogar exists in the southwestern corridor of the temple, which, by legend, is said to be connected by a tunnel to a cave in the heart of the hill, where Bhogar continues to meditate and maintain his vigil, with eight idols of Muruga.

The deity, after centuries of worship, fell into neglect and was suffered to be engulfed by the forest. One night, Perumal a king of the Chera Dynasty, who controlled the area between the second and fifth centuries A.D., wandered from his hunting party and was forced to take refuge at the foot of the hill. It so befell, that the Murugan, appeared to him in a dream, and ordered him to restore the idol to its former state. The king commenced a search for the idol, and finding it, constructed the temple that now houses it, and re-instituted its worship.

Architecture

The idol of the deity is said to be made of an amalgam of nine poisonous substances which forms an eternal medicine when mixed in a certain ratio. It is placed upon a pedestal of stone, with an archway framing it and represents the god Kuzhanthai Velappar in the form he assumed at Poombarai - that of a very young recluse, shorn of his locks and all his finery.

The temple is built in a typical South India temple architectural style. There is no tower. The sanctum sanctorum faces towards the east direction. The main idol, Kulandai Velappan is present in the standing posture in the sanctum sanctorum. His mount (vahanam) peacock is found near the Bali peetham and flag staff facing towards the main shrine.

There is a sub-shrine where the metal Utsava idols of Ganesha and Subramanya with his consorts are placed. It is found near the sanctum sanctorum.

The wall around the main shrine has Nataraja and Dattatreya as the Koshta idols. It is very rare to find Nataraja and Dattatreya in the form of carvings as the Koshta idols. Moreover, it is also rare to find the carving or idol of Dattatreya. The temple also houses many sub-shrines of various deities such as Shiva Linga, Ganesha, Navagraha, Bhairava, Idumban, Dakshinamurti and Nagas.

The sanctum of the temple is of early Chera architecture

Religious practices

One of the main traditions of the temple, is the tonsuring of devotees, who vow to discard their hair in imitation of the Lord of Poombarai. Another is the anointing of the head of the presiding deity's idol with sandalwood paste, at night, prior to the temple being closed for the day. The paste, upon being allowed to stay overnight, is said to acquire medicinal properties, and is much sought after and distributed to devotees, as rakkāla chandaṇam.</ref>

Festivals and religious practises
Every year Poombarai celebrates Ther Thiruvizha (car festival) for Lord Muruga. It falls on Kettai nakshatra which comes after Thai Poosam. Normally it comes in Thai or Maasi month.
</ref>

Religious importance
There is a song-poem(Poombarai Velan) by Aruna giri nathar who lived during the 15th century while visited this temple this god has saved Arunagiri nathar from one devil by acted as a Baby(Kulanthai), The peoples is trusting because of this incident only Poombarai Murugan has called as Kuzhanthai Velappar Also some of others trusting this idol is made up of Dasaphasanam which is Ten different herbals. And this abhishegam cures more diseases like cancer and sugar etc. By scientifically more 'Siddhar' lived around western-gates so this Temple location also Middle of western-gates only so we can confirm the stories of Bhogar idols</ref>

Notes

References

External links
Official website of Arulmigu Dandayudhapani Swami Devasthanam, Palani
Temple legends

Hindu temples in Dindigul district
Murugan temples in Tamil Nadu
Kaumaram